Falcon Heights is the name of some places in the United States:
 Falcon Heights, Minnesota
 Falcon Heights, Oregon
 Falcon Heights, Texas